Kauko Kauppinen (born 12 January 1940) is a Finnish basketball player. He competed in the men's tournament at the 1964 Summer Olympics in which Finland placed 11th.

References

External links
 

1940 births
Living people
Finnish men's basketball players
Olympic basketball players of Finland
Basketball players at the 1964 Summer Olympics
People from Vihti
Sportspeople from Uusimaa